Padmacharan Samantasinhar (born December 1917) is an Indian politician. He was elected to the Lok Sabha, the lower house of the Parliament of India as a member of the Janata Party.

References

External links
 Official biographical sketch in Parliament of India website

1917 births
Possibly living people
Lok Sabha members from Odisha
India MPs 1977–1979
Janata Party politicians 
Indian National Congress politicians from Odisha